Ramona is a 1884 American novel written by Helen Hunt Jackson. Set in Southern California after the Mexican–American War, it portrays the life of a mixed-race Scottish–Native American orphan girl, who suffers racial discrimination and hardship. The story was inspired by the marriage of Hugo Reid and Victoria Reid. Originally serialized in the Christian Union on a weekly basis, the novel became immensely popular. It has had more than 300 printings, and been adapted five times as a film. A play adaptation has been performed annually outdoors since 1923.

The novel's influence on the culture and image of Southern California was considerable. Its sentimental portrayal of Mexican colonial life contributed to establishing a unique cultural identity for the region. As its publication coincided with the arrival of railroad lines in the region, countless tourists visited who wanted to see the locations of the novel.

Plot
In Southern California, shortly after the Mexican–American War, a Scottish-Native American orphan girl, Ramona, is raised by Señora Gonzaga Moreno, the sister of Ramona's deceased foster mother. Ramona is referred to as illegitimate in some summaries of the novel, but chapter 3 of the novel says that Ramona's parents were married by a priest in the San Gabriel Mission. Señora Moreno has raised Ramona as part of the family, giving her every luxury, but only because Ramona's foster mother had requested it as her dying wish. Because of Ramona's mixed Native American heritage, Moreno does not love her. That love is reserved for her only child, Felipe Moreno, whom she adores. Señora Moreno identifies as Mexican of Spanish ancestry, although California has recently been taken over by the United States. She hates the Americans, who have cut up her huge rancho after disputing her claim to it.

Señora Moreno delays the sheep shearing, a major event on the rancho, awaiting the arrival of a group of Native Americans from Temecula, whom she always hires for that work. The head of the Native American sheep shearers is Alessandro, the son of Pablo Assís, the chief of the tribe. Alessandro is the hero of the story—tall, wise, honest, and piously Catholic. Señora Moreno is also awaiting a priest, Father Salvierderra, from Santa Barbara, a saintly man who is honored by Native and Spanish alike. Señora Moreno awaits the priest so that the Native American workers can worship and make confession in her chapel before they go back to Temecula.

Alessandro quickly falls in love with Ramona and agrees to stay on at the Rancho. In time, Ramona also falls in love with Alessandro. Señora Moreno is outraged because, although Ramona is half-Native American, the Señora does not want her to marry a Native American. Ramona realizes that Señora Moreno has never loved her, and she and Alessandro elope.

The rest of the novel charts the two lovers' miseries. They have a daughter, and travel around Southern California trying to find a place to settle. In the aftermath of war, Alessandro's tribe is driven off their land, marking a new wave of European-American settlement in California from the United States. They endure misery and hardship, for the Americans who buy their land also demand their houses and their farm tools. Greedy Americans drive them off several homesteads, and they cannot find a permanent community that is not threatened by encroachment of United States settlers. They finally move into the San Bernardino Mountains. Alessandro slowly loses his mind, due to the constant humiliation. He loves Ramona fiercely, and regrets having taken her away from relative comfort in return for "bootless" wandering. Their daughter "Eyes of the Sky" dies because a white doctor would not go to their homestead to treat her. They have another daughter, named Ramona, but Alessandro still suffers. One day he rides off with the horse of an American, who follows him and shoots him, although he knew that Alessandro was mentally unbalanced.

Ramona was gone from the Moreno rancho for two years. Felipe Moreno finds the young widow, and they return to his mother Señora Moreno's estate with the girl also named Ramona.  Felipe has always loved the senior Ramona and finds her more beautiful than ever. Although Ramona still loves the late Alessandro, and because Señora Moreno has died and can no longer forbid the marriage, Ramona agrees to marry Felipe. They have several more children together. Ramona, the daughter of Ramona and Alessandro, is their favorite.

Main characters
Ramona, Scottish-Native American orphan girl
Señora Gonzaga Moreno, sister of Ramona's dead foster mother
Felipe Moreno, Gonzaga Moreno's only child
Alessandro Assis, a young Native American sheepherder
Father Salvierderra, a Catholic priest

Major themes
Jackson wrote Ramona three years after A Century of Dishonor, her non-fiction study of the mistreatment of Native Americans in the United States. By following that history with a novel, she sought to portray the Indian experience "in a way to move people's hearts." She wanted to arouse public opinion and concern for the betterment of their plight, much as Harriet Beecher Stowe's novel Uncle Tom's Cabin had done for slaves. Her success in this effort was limited.

Jackson intended Ramona to appeal directly to the reader's emotions. The novel's political criticism was clear, but most readers were moved by its romantic vision of colonial California under Spanish and Mexican rule. Jackson had become enamored of the Spanish missions in California, which she romanticized. The story's fictional vision of Franciscan churchmen, señoritas and caballeros permeated the novel and captured the imaginations of readers. Her novel characterized the Americans as villains and the Native Americans as "noble savages".

Many American migrants had looked down on the Hispanic occupants of California when they arrived in the region. The new settlers from northern and midwestern states disparaged what they saw as a decadent culture of leisure and recreation among the elite Latinos, who had huge tracts of land, lived in a region with prevailing mild weather and unusually fertile soil, and relied heavily on Native American laborers. The new settlers favored the Protestant work ethic. This view was not universal, however. American settlers and readers in other regions were taken by Jackson's portrayal of the Spanish and Mexican society. Readers accepted the Californio aristocracy as portrayed and the Ramona myth was born.

Reception
Ramona was immensely popular almost immediately upon its publication in 1884, with more than 15,000 copies sold in the ten months before Jackson's death in 1885. One year after her death, the North American Review called it "unquestionably the best novel yet produced by an American woman" and named it, along with Uncle Tom's Cabin, one of two most ethical novels of the 19th century. By sixty years after its publication, 600,000 copies had been sold. There have been more than 300 reissues to date and the book has never been out of print.

Subtle racism may have contributed to the popularity of the character of Ramona and the novel. Of mixed race, she was described as beautiful, with black hair and blue eyes. Errol Wayne Stevens, of the California Historical Society, notes several contemporary reviews of the novel in which writers dismissed the idea that Ramona could have been part Native American, a race which they characterized as "dull, heavy and unimpressionable," and "lazy, cruel, cowardly, and covetous."

Carobeth Laird, in her 1975 autobiography, Encounter with an Angry God, (p. 176), describes the reaction of her Chemehuevi Indian husband to the novel: "... when I tried to read him Helen Hunt Jackson's Ramona, he grew restless, walked up and down, and finally said that the white woman knew nothing about Indians."

Jackson was disappointed that she was unable to raise public concerns about the struggles of the Indians in California, as readers were taken with the romantic vision of Californio society. However, in her book The Annotated Ramona, the historian Antoinette May argued that the popularity of the novel contributed to Congress passing the Dawes Act in 1887. This was the first American law to address Indian land rights and it forced the breakup of communal lands and redistribution to individual households, with sales of what the government said was "surplus land".

Cultural influence

The runaway popularity of the novel inspired jurisdictions to name schools (Ramona High School in Riverside), streets, freeways (the San Bernardino Freeway was originally named the Ramona Freeway) and towns (unincorporated communities called Ramona in both Los Angeles and San Diego County) after the novel's heroine. The novel contributed to making southern California a tourist destination, as many people wanted to see the locations featured in the book. Its publication coincided with the opening of Southern Pacific Railroad's Southern California rail lines and fed a tourism boom.

As a result, locations all over Southern California tried to emphasize their Ramona connections. Jackson died without specifying the locations on which her story was based. Two places claimed to have inspired her work: Rancho Camulos, near Piru, and Rancho Guajome in Vista, as she had visited both before writing her novel.

Camulos became the most accepted "Home of Ramona" due to several factors. Moreno Ranch is described in a way that is similar to the location of Camulos. Influential writers, such as George Wharton James and Charles Fletcher Lummis, avowed that it was so. When the Southern Pacific Railroad's opened its main Ventura County line in 1887, it stopped at Camulos. With the company engaged in a rate war, it made the trip to Camulos relatively easy and affordable. Finally, the Del Valle family of Camulos welcomed tourists: they exploited the association in marketing their products, labeling their oranges and wine as "The Home of Ramona" brand.

In contrast, Guajome did not publicly become associated with Ramona until an 1894 article in Rural Californian made the claim. However, as the house was nearly four miles (6 km) away from the nearest Santa Fe Railroad station, getting there was not so easy. Additionally, the Couts family, who owned the property, were not eager to have flocks of tourists on the grounds, possibly due to a falling out between Jackson and Sra. Couts.

The Estudillo House in Old Town San Diego identified itself as "Ramona's Marriage Place" due to brief descriptions of Ramona's having been married in San Diego. Although no record existed of Jackson's having visited there, it too became a popular tourist destination, a status continuing for years after the novel's publication. The Estudillo House was unique in marketing solely in terms of Ramona-related tourism. The caretaker sold pieces of the house to tourists, which hastened its deterioration. In 1907, the new owner John D. Spreckels hired architect Hazel Wood Waterman to remodel the house to more closely match descriptions in the novel. When the reconstruction was completed in 1910, the building reopened as a full-fledged Ramona tourist attraction. Estudillo House's application for National Historic Landmark status was entitled "Casa Estudillo/Ramona's Marriage Place".

Other notable Ramona landmarks included "Ramona's Birthplace", a small adobe near Mission San Gabriel Arcángel, and the grave of Ramona Lubo on the Ramona Band of Cahuilla Indians reservation. Writer George Wharton James called Lubo the "real Ramona." Her life bore some resemblance to that of the fictional Ramona. Sixteen years after Lubo's death, local people erected a "Ramona monument" at her gravesite in 1938. The Ramona Pageant, an outdoor staging of the novel, started in 1923 in Hemet and has been held annually since.

Most historians believe that the fictional Moreno Ranch is an amalgamation of various locations and was not intended to represent a single place. As Carey McWilliams described in his book Southern California Country:
Picture postcards, by the tens of thousands, were published showing "the schools attended by Ramona," "the original of Ramona," "the place where Ramona was married," and various shots of the "Ramona Country." [...] It was not long before the scenic postcards depicting the Ramona Country had come to embrace all of Southern California.

Because of the novel's extraordinary popularity, the public perception merged fact and fiction. California historian Walton Bean wrote:
These legends became so ingrained in the culture of Southern California that they were often mistaken for realities. In later years many who visited "Ramona's birthplace" in San Diego or the annual "Ramona Pageant" at Hemet (eighty miles north of San Diego) were surprised and disappointed if they chanced to learn that Ramona was a (fictional) novel rather than a biography.

The novel contributed to the unique cultural identity of Southern California and the whole of the Southwest. The architecture of the missions had recently gained national exposure and local restoration projects were just beginning. Railroad lines to Southern California were just opening and, combined with the emotions stirred by the novel, the region suddenly gained national attention. The Mission Revival Style architecture became popular from about 1890 to 1915, with many examples standing throughout California and other southwest areas.

Adaptations
Ramona has been adapted several times for other media. The first was a silent film by the same name, released in 1910. It was directed by D. W. Griffith and starred Mary Pickford. Other versions were made in 1928, 1936 and 1946.
 Ramona (1910 film), a 17-minute short directed by D. W. Griffith
 Ramona (1916 film), directed by Donald Crisp
 Ramona (1928 film), directed by Edwin Carewe, featuring Dolores del Río and Warner Baxter
 Ramona (1936 film), directed by Henry King, featuring Loretta Young and Don Ameche
 Ramona (1946 film), directed by Víctor Urruchúa
 Screen Guild Theater, 1945 radio broadcast
 Ramona (2000 TV series), a Mexican telenovela
 The Ramona Pageant, an annual outdoor play performed annually since 1923 in Hemet, California. The Ramona Pageant is the largest and longest running outdoor play in the United States and it is the official state play of the State of California.

See also

 California Genocide
 Spanish missions in California

References

Further reading

External links

 
 Ramona, available at Internet Archive
 

Books about Native Americans
1884 American novels
Novels set in California
Fictional characters from California
Fictional Native American people
Western (genre) heroes and heroines
Native American history of California
Novels first published in serial form
Works originally published in American newspapers
Novels about orphans
American novels adapted into plays
Ramona, Los Angeles County, California
Ramona, San Diego County, California
American novels adapted into films
Novels by Helen Hunt Jackson
Fictional Native American women